Receptor tyrosine-protein kinase erbB-3, also known as HER3 (human epidermal growth factor receptor 3), is a membrane bound protein that in humans is encoded by the ERBB3 gene.

ErbB3 is a member of the epidermal growth factor receptor (EGFR/ERBB) family of receptor tyrosine kinases. The kinase-impaired ErbB3 is known to form active heterodimers with other members of the ErbB family, most notably the ligand binding-impaired ErbB2.

Gene and expression 

The human ERBB3 gene is located on the long arm of chromosome 12 (12q13). It is encoded by 23,651 base pairs and translates into 1342 amino acids.

During human development, ERBB3 is expressed in skin, bone, muscle, nervous system, heart, lungs, and intestinal epithelium. ERBB3 is expressed in normal adult human gastrointestinal tract, reproductive system, skin, nervous system, urinary tract, and endocrine system.

Structure 

ErbB3, like the other members of the ErbB receptor tyrosine kinase family, consists of an extracellular domain, a transmembrane domain, and an intracellular domain. The extracellular domain contains four subdomains (I-IV). Subdomains I and III are leucine-rich and are primarily involved in ligand binding. Subdomains II and IV are cysteine-rich and most likely contribute to protein conformation and stability through the formation of disulfide bonds. Subdomain II also contains the dimerization loop required for dimer formation. The cytoplasmic domain contains a juxtamembrane segment, a kinase domain, and a C-terminal domain.

Unliganded receptor adopts a conformation that inhibits dimerization. Binding of neuregulin to the ligand binding subdomains (I and III) induces a conformational change in ErbB3 that causes the protrusion of the dimerization loop in subdomain II, activating the protein for dimerization.

Function 

ErbB3 has been shown to bind the ligands heregulin and NRG-2. Ligand binding causes a change in conformation that allows for dimerization, phosphorylation, and activation of signal transduction. ErbB3 can heterodimerize with any of the other three ErbB family members. The theoretical ErbB3 homodimer would be non-functional because the kinase-impaired protein requires transphosphorylation by its binding partner to be active.

Unlike the other ErbB receptor tyrosine kinase family members which are activated through autophosphorylation upon ligand binding, ErbB3 was found to be kinase impaired, having only 1/1000 the autophosphorylation activity of EGFR and no ability to phosphorylate other proteins. Therefore, ErbB3 must act as an allosteric activator.

Interaction with ErbB2 

The ErbB2-ErbB3 dimer is considered the most active of the possible ErbB dimers, in part because ErbB2 is the preferred dimerization partner of all the ErbB family members, and ErbB3 is the preferred partner of ErbB2. This heterodimer conformation allows the signaling complex to activate multiple pathways including the MAPK, PI3K/Akt, and PLCγ. There is also evidence that the ErbB2-ErbB3 heterodimer can bind and be activated by EGF-like ligands.

Activation of the PI3K/Akt pathway 

The intracellular domain of ErbB3 contains 6 recognition sites for the SH2 domain of the p85 subunit of PI3K. ErbB3 binding causes the allosteric activation of p110α, the lipid kinase subunit of PI3K, a function not found in either EGFR or ErbB2.

Role in cancer 

While no evidence has been found that ErbB3 overexpression, constitutive activation, or mutation alone is oncogenic,  the protein as a heterodimerization partner, most critically with ErbB2, is implicated in growth, proliferation, chemotherapeutic resistance, and the promotion of invasion and metastasis.

ErbB3 is associated with targeted therapeutic resistance in numerous cancers including resistance to:
 HER2 inhibitors in HER2+ breast cancers
 anti-estrogen therapy in ER+ breast cancers
 EGFR inhibitors in lung and head and neck cancers
 hormones in prostate cancers
 IGF1R inhibitors in hepatomas
 BRAF inhibitors in melanoma

ErbB2 overexpression may promote the formation of active heterodimers with ErbB3 and other ErbB family members without the need for ligand binding, resulting in weak but constitutive signaling activity.

Role in normal development 

ERBB3 is expressed in the mesenchyme of the endocardial cushion, which will later develop into the valves of the heart. ErbB3 null mouse embryos show severely underdeveloped atrioventricular valves, leading to death at embryonic day 13.5.  Although this function of ErbB3 depends on neuregulin, it does not seem to require ErbB2, which is not expressed in the tissue.

ErbB3 also seems to be required for neural crest differentiation and the development of the sympathetic nervous system and neural crest derivatives such as Schwann cells.

See also
 Epidermal growth factor receptor family
 Epidermal growth factor receptor
 Receptor tyrosine-kinases

References

Further reading

Tyrosine kinase receptors